The Love Hermit is a 1916 American silent drama film directed by Jack Prescott. The film stars William Russell and Charlotte Burton.

Cast
 William Russell as Tom Weston
 Charlotte Burton as Marie Bolton
 Harry von Meter as James Bolton
 William Stowell as Jack Hillman
 Queenie Rosson as Grace Hamilton
 Ashton Dearholt in Undetermined Role

External links

1916 films
1916 drama films
Silent American drama films
American silent feature films
American black-and-white films
1910s American films